Costabieta horrida is a species of sea snail, a marine gastropod mollusk in the family Pyramidellidae, the pyrams and their allies. This species has three synonyms, two within the genus Rissiona and one within Costabieta.

Distribution
This species occurs in the Red Sea, the Central and East Indian Ocean, the Western Pacific Ocean, off Malaysia and Indo-China.

References

The Tibe Chrysallidini. ECIMAT (Estación de Ciencias Mariñas de Toralla) - Universidade de Vigo, 412 pp

External links
 To World Register of Marine Species

Pyramidellidae
Gastropods described in 1873